Sedum microstachyum is a species of flowering plant in the family Crassulaceae. It is referred to by the common name small-spiked stonecrop. It is an erect, succulent, monocarpic herb, with an unbranched stem up to 40 cm high. Leaves succulent, simple, entire, glandular, hairy, reddish in sunny positions, sessile, the basal crowded in rosettes, spathulate-linear 3-7 x 0.5-1.5 cm, the higher smaller, spirally arranged. Flowers actinomorphic, small, reddish or greenish, in a cylindrical panicle, Flowers from June to September. Fruit a many-seeded follicle.

Habitat
Rock crevices on igneous formations at 1500–1900 m altitude.

Distribution
Endemic to Cyprus, confined to the Troödos forest where it is fairly common: Chromion, Khionistra, Loumata, Aeton and Troödos Square.

References

External links
 http://1.bp.blogspot.com/-JPvTiMx4TYA/Us0Uzip_zfI/AAAAAAAAPbQ/LDHDQZVl2As/s1600/Sedum+microstachyum+(1).JPG
 http://botany.cz/cs/sedum-microstachyum/
 http://www.rareplants.es/shop/uploads/images_products_large/10604.jpg
 http://www.theplantlist.org/tpl1.1/record/kew-2483382
 http://blog-imgs-44-origin.fc2.com/h/a/w/haworthia/s-microstachyum120325-3.jpg

microstachyum
Endemic flora of Cyprus
Taxa named by Pierre Edmond Boissier
Taxa named by Theodor Kotschy